510th may refer to:

510th Squadron (disambiguation), several units
510th Heavy Panzer Battalion, a German Panzer-Abteilung equipped with heavy tanks
510th Tactical Missile Wing, a United States Air Force unit

See also
510 (number)
510, the year 510 (DX) of the Julian calendar
510 BC